Thomas Patterson may refer to:

Thomas Patterson (Pennsylvania politician) (1764–1841), United States Congressman from Pennsylvania
Thomas Patterson (Arizona politician), member of the Arizona State Senate
Thomas H. Patterson (1820–1889), U.S. naval officer during the American Civil War
Thomas M. Patterson (1839–1916), United States Representative and Senator from Colorado
 Thomas C. Patterson, American politician
 Tom Patterson (theatre producer) (1920–2005), Canadian journalist and festival manager 
 Tom Patterson (baseball) (1845–1900), Major League Baseball outfielder
 Thomas Patterson (cricketer) (1839–?), Australian cricketer
 Thomas Stewart Patterson (1872–1949), Scottish organic chemist
 Thomas E. Patterson, American political scientist
 Tom Patterson (basketball) (1948–1982), basketball forward
 Tom Patterson (entrepreneur) (born 1979), American entrepreneur
 Tom Patterson (Florida politician) (born 1943), American politician in the state of Florida
 Tom Patterson (Arrowverse), a character from The Flash

See also
Thomas Paterson (disambiguation)